Elgspiggen  is a mountain located on the border of Tolga Municipality and Rendalen Municipality in Innlandet county, Norway. It is part of the Holøydalen mountain area. The  mountain is easily recognizable due to its shape like a pyramid. It is the tallest peak in Tolga Municipality.

Name
The mountain name, is literally translated to "Moose's Peak" since the Norwegian word  means 'moose' and the word  means 'peak of a mountain'. In Norway, the moose is seen as the king of all animals inhabiting the Norwegian forests.

Access
Access to Elgspiggen is possible all year around. In the summer weather, you can access the peak by taking a  hike from Orvdalen and heading  to the west. You can also access the mountain by a  hike from Heggerådalen and heading south. In the winter, cross-country skiing is the only possible way to reach the mountain. Its steep pyramid shape makes Elgspiggen popular for off-piste skiing. From the top, you can view other great peaks. In the west you will spot Snøhetta and Rondane while in the south you are able to see Rendalssølen with its three peaks.

See also
List of mountains of Norway

References

Mountains of Innlandet
Rendalen
Tolga, Norway